A Perfect Getaway is a 2009 American thriller film written and directed by David Twohy and starring Timothy Olyphant, Milla Jovovich, Kiele Sanchez, and Steve Zahn. Olyphant, Jovovich, Sanchez, and Zahn portray a group of vacationing couples in Hawaii who find their lives in danger when murders begin to occur on the island, leading to suspicions over one of the couples being the killers.

Shot in Hawaii and Puerto Rico, A Perfect Getaway was released on August 7, 2009, in the United States. It received generally positive reviews from critics and grossed $22 million on a $14 million budget.

Plot
For their honeymoon, newlyweds Cliff and Cydney travel to Hawaii. After making a travel video in the car, the two spend the night in a hotel before driving off in order to start hiking towards a remote beach. Whilst in the car, the two encounter fellow couple; kind-hearted Cleo who attempts to hitchhike with them and hot-headed Kale who takes Cleo away from the two. On the hike, they are befriended by tourist Nick and his girlfriend Gina. Nick and Gina accompany Cliff and Cydney in their journey, but tensions begin to arise in the group when a double homicide of an unidentified couple is reported in the area, with a man and woman being suspected as the killers. The two couples arrive at a waterfall where Kale and Cleo happen to be also, Kale makes vague threats to Cydney which seemingly worries Cliff. Nick also discovers that Cliff is a screenwriter and attempts to convince him to have a movie made of him - for he was a soldier and had his skull crushed in but survived thanks to an operation where metal plates were put in his head. Cliff lets Nick continue on about this throughout the journey despite not intending to make a movie on it. After moving on, the four go deeper into the jungle and become wary of each other due to the reported murders. The tensions, however, die down after the four witness Kale and Cleo being arrested for the murders after some teeth were found in Kale's backpack.

Arriving at their destination, Cliff convinces Nick to explore a marine cave with him while Cydney and Gina wait behind on the beach. Gina looks through photos at a camera before suddenly screaming at Nick and Cliff, however they ignore her and she begins to scale a cliff after them with Cydney in pursuit. Once alone with Cliff in the cave, Nick realizes that he has been tricked as Cliff draws a gun. It is revealed that the real Cliff and Cydney were the unidentified victims of the double homicide, murdered by their impostors. The impostor Cliff is Rocky, the high school boyfriend of the imposter Cydney, and the two are meth addicts and have been committing the murders to assume the identities of their victims - getting the victims life stories by pretending to be scriptwriters. Gina, who saw the wedding photos with the real Cliff and Cydney, witnesses Rocky shoot Nick and attempts to escape. After fighting off Cliff, but being stabbed and shot, Gina runs into the jungle. Rocky tells his girlfriend to mislead the police about the transpiring events while he chases after Gina.

Gina finds some men but Rocky kills them all and seriously injures Gina before she manages to escape. Rocky's pursuit of Gina is stopped by the emergence of Nick, who survived the gunshot due to the previously mentioned metal plates. Nick gains the upper hand and holds Rocky at gunpoint, but a police helicopter contacted by Rocky's girlfriend arrives on the scene, warning Nick that he will be shot if he does not release Rocky. As Rocky tries to goad Nick into killing him, Gina gets Nick to back down. Realizing that she can stop Rocky, who is extremely abusive, and save two people who love each other, Rocky's girlfriend admits that Rocky is the murderer, prompting the police to shoot him when he tries to retrieve his gun.

Travelling back on a helicopter, Nick proposes to Gina. Gina accepts, with the two mutually agreeing not to go on a honeymoon.

Cast
 Steve Zahn as Cliff Anderson / Rocky
 Timothy Olyphant as Nick Bennett
 Milla Jovovich as Cydney Anderson
 Kiele Sanchez as Gina Stone
 Marley Shelton as Cleo
 Chris Hemsworth as Kale Garrity

Additionally, Anthony Ruivivar plays Chronic, a guide, and Dale Dickey and Peter Tuiasosopo appear as convenience store employees Earth Momma and Supply Guy. Holt McCallany and Isaac Santiago portray the police lieutenant and the police shooter, while Tory Kittles plays Sherman, one of the kayakers. The real Cliff and Cydney, referred to in the credits as "Groom" and "Bride", are portrayed by Ryan Gessell and Evelyn Lopez.

Soundtrack
"Hey, Hey, Hey" — Tracy Adams
"Paradise" — RooHub
"Need Your Love" — Aswad
"Boom Chic Boom Chic" — Tracy Adams
"Red Dress Baby Doll" — Tracy Adams
"Ghetto Chronic" — Tracy Adams
"The Wretched" — Nine Inch Nails
"I'm Yours" — Jason Mraz

Marketing
The film was promoted with several videos posted to YouTube. The reports, attributed to the fictional news agency Global Digital News created by Universal Pictures, detailed a string of homicides targeting honeymooning couples. They were posted to a YouTube channel designed to look like a local news station.

Release
The film was released in the United States on August 7, 2009 and grossed $5,948,555 in its opening weekend.  The film made £418,703 in its first week in the United Kingdom and reached number 10 at the UK box office. Worldwide, it grossed $22,852,638.

The unrated director's cut DVD and Blu-ray were released on December 29, 2009.

Reception
On Rotten Tomatoes the film holds an approval rating of 62% based on 138 reviews, with an average rating 5.8/10. The site's critics consensus reads: "While smarter than the average slasher film, A Perfect Getaway eventually devolves into a standard, predictable, excessively violent thriller." Metacritic assigned the film a weighted average score of 63 out of 100, based on 22 critics, indicating "generally favorable reviews". Audiences polled by CinemaScore gave the film an average grade of "B−" on an A+ to F scale.

The New York Times referred to the film as a "genuinely satisfying cheap thrill". More mixed reviews include the Times Online, which gave the film 3 out of 5 stars, adding that it is a "smart" thriller but is a "little too tricky for its own good". Additionally, The Guardian rated the film 60% and said that the film is a "flawed but entertaining thriller". Michael Phillips gave the film 2 1/2 stars (out of four) and stated that A Perfect Getaway "has the fortitude to venture off the beaten path of formula."

Timothy Olyphant was the first runner-up for Toronto Film Critics Association Award for Best Supporting Actor.

See also
 Fear Island

References

External links

2009 films
2009 crime thriller films
2009 psychological thriller films
American crime thriller films
American psychological thriller films
Films about murderers
Films directed by David Twohy
Films set in Hawaii
Films set on beaches
Films set on islands
Films shot in Hawaii
QED International films
Relativity Media films
Rogue (company) films
Films with screenplays by David Twohy
2000s survival films
American slasher films
2000s slasher films
Films shot in Puerto Rico
Films about honeymoon
2000s English-language films
2000s American films